Nicaraguan may refer to:
 Something of, from, or related to Nicaragua, the largest country in Central America
 Nicaraguans, people from Nicaragua or of Nicaraguan descent or heritage. For information about the Nicaraguan people, see Demographics of Nicaragua and Culture of Nicaragua. For specific persons, see List of Nicaraguans.
 Nicaraguan Spanish, the variety of Central American Spanish spoken in Nicaragua
 Nicaraguan Sign Language
 Nicaraguan cuisine

See also